Umkomasia macleanii is an ovulate structure of a seed fern (Pteridospermatophyta and the nominate genus of Family Umkomasiaceae. It was first described by Hamshaw Thomas from the Umkomaas locality of South Africa.

Description 
The ovulate structures of Umkomasia macleanii differ from other species of Umkomasia in small size, and limited geographic distribution.

Whole plant reconstructions 
Umkomasia macleanii may have been produced by the same plant as Pteruchus africanus (pollen organs) and Dicroidium odontopteroides (leaves), based on cuticular similarities between these leaves and reproductive structures at the Umkomaas locality of South Africa.

References 

Triassic plants
Pteridospermatophyta